The Ceremonies is an EP by American indie rock band The Ceremonies. It was released on October 8, 2013, in the United States.

Background
The EP includes five songs, "Wolfdance", "Land Of Gathering", "Straw Hat", "Ballroom Bones" and "Nightlight". Which will be featured on their upcoming debut studio album.

Track listing

Release history

References

External links
 

2013 debut EPs
Capitol Records EPs